Tarzan is a series that aired on NBC from 1966 to 1968. The series portrayed Tarzan (played by Ron Ely) as a well-educated character who had grown tired of civilization, and returned to the jungle where he had been raised.  It was filmed in Brazil. The production later relocated to Mexico. This series was set in one of the newly independent African countries of the time.

This series retained many of the trappings of the film series, included the "Tarzan yell" and Cheeta, but excluded Jane as part of the "new look" for the fabled apeman that executive producer Sy Weintraub had introduced in previous motion pictures starring Gordon Scott, Jock Mahoney, and Mike Henry.  CBS aired repeat episodes of the program during the summer of 1969.

Cast
 Ron Ely as Tarzan
 Manuel Padilla, Jr. as Jai
 Alan Caillou as Jason Flood
 Rockne Tarkington as Rao

Recurring appearances
Maurice Evans guest starred as retired Brigadier Sir Basil Bertram, hero of the Battle of the Bulge, in four episodes. Julie Harris guest starred as missionary Charity Jones in four episodes. Chips Rafferty appeared as Dutch Jensen in two episodes.

Episode list

Season 1: 1966–67

Season 2: 1967–68

Syndication
After being seen intermittently in syndication and on cable in the years after its network run, as of 2016, the series airs on the Heroes & Icons network Saturday mornings. It lasted until September 2018.

On June 4–5, 2016 the Decades TV network ran a marathon of the series. On September 9, 2016 Decades celebrated Tarzan's fiftieth anniversary repeating a few choice episodes.

Home media
On March 13, 2012, Warner Bros. released Tarzan: Season 1, Part 1 & Tarzan: Season 1, Part 2 on DVD in region 1 via their Warner Archive Collection manufacture-on-demand service. The second season was released complete on September 17, 2013.

Opening Scene
Iguazu Falls, in opening scene. This series had two separate musical theme's as featured in Season One. "Tarzan's March" by far being the overall favorite but unfortunately not featured in Season Two for the opening scene or the end credits. Over both seasons, the show had three different theme tunes.

"Tarzan's March" music originally composed by "Sydney Lee & Walter Greene" which gained additional fame and was covered by several artists including "Al Hirt & His Orchestra",  
"Marty Manning & The Cheetahs" & even "Lawrence Welk & His Orchestra".

References

External links

 
 Edgar Rice Burroughs, Inc.: Tarzan on TV

Tarzan television series
Television series by Warner Bros. Television Studios
NBC original programming
1966 American television series debuts
1968 American television series endings
Television shows filmed in Brazil
Television shows filmed in Mexico